is a Japanese manga series written and illustrated by Yoshiki Takaya. The Guyver itself is a symbiotic techno-organic (or biomechanical) device that enhances the capabilities of its host.

The manga was originally serialized in Tokuma Shoten's Monthly Shōnen Captain, the first appearance being in the February 18 magazine beginning in 1985. When Shōnen Captain was discontinued in 1997, the manga was picked up by Kadokawa Shoten who subsequently re-released all of the previous tankōbon originally published by Tokuma. The manga is currently serialized in Kadokawa's Young Ace magazine. It has been licensed by Viz Media, Star Comics and Chuang Yi Publishing.

Guyver has been adapted into a single OVA titled Guyver: Out of Control (1986, based loosely on the first volume), a 12-episode anime OVA series (1989 to 1992, based on the first four volumes), two live action movies (1991's The Guyver and 1994's Guyver 2: Dark Hero) as well as a 26-episode anime series (2005 to 2006, based on the first ten volumes).There was also a novel released in 1989 and two light novels in 1995

Plot
A test type Zoanoid escapes from the Cronos Corporation with three Guyver Units. Cronos soldiers pursue the test type into some woods to recover the units from him, but when they corner the test type, he detonates a bomb he had with him. The Guyver Units are scattered in the blast. One of the lost Guyver Units, known as "Unit I", lands near two young high school students, Shō Fukamachi and Tetsurō Segawa. The second one is retrieved by Cronos and merges with Oswald A. Lisker to become the second Guyver later on. The final unit falls into the hands of Agito Makishima, who merges with it at an unspecified time. Shō accidentally activates the unit which then painfully merges with him.

Over time, Shō learns more about the Guyver and its abilities. The Guyver is virtually invulnerable, with its only weak point being the Control Metal. With this part intact, it can rebuild the host from their data it stores within, but if this part is critically damaged,  the host will be eaten alive by the unit and perish. This is disconcerting and Shō starts to question whether he will ever be free from the Guyver. The situation gets worse with the fact that Cronos is continuously sending more and more powerful Zoanoids to retrieve the Guyver. This makes it increasingly difficult for Shō to protect his vulnerable friends.

As the story progresses it also takes a startling turn, in which Cronos succeeds in taking over the world and reshaping it according to its ideals. The Guyvers are then labeled to the public as a "vanguard of alien invaders".

Characters

The main protagonist of the series, Shō is seventeen years old and a second-year student at Narisawa high school. He has black hair and a slim build. He fights Cronos to protect his friends and family than from any need to see the enemy brought to justice. Had he not become host for a Guyver Unit, he would have happily continued in ignorance of Cronos. He cares deeply for Mizuki Segawa with the intensity of first love and Tetsuro Segawa, Mizuki's older brother, is his closest friend. As he is the host for the first Unit activated, he is known as "Guyver I".

A large-framed, chubby third-year student, Tetsuro is Shō's closest friend. He is highly intelligent and can think rapidly when he has to. He is a rabid science fiction fan and the leader of the sci-fi society in the school, which gives him the background knowledge to make numerous accurate guesses about the Guyver armor, Zoanoids and Cronos. He wears his hair short and has glasses.

Mizuki is a typical schoolgirl. At the beginning of the story, she has a crush on Agito Makishima, but later begins to appreciate Shō more. She is somewhat short even for a Japanese girl, very slender and wears her hair in a page-boy cut that emphasizes her large eyes.

Agito is of medium build and muscular; he is a third-year student at the same high school the others attend, but looks older. Portrayed as an anti-hero, he almost never allows sentiment to stand in his way. He appears shrewd and calculating. At one point a candidate-member of the Cronos Elite, he is now viewed by them as a traitor. Even though he may have activated his Unit before Oswald A. Lisker, the second Guyver, he did not openly appear in his Guyver armor until after Lisker was eliminated and thus he was dubbed "Guyver III". Agito shows a frightening knowledge of what the Guyver can do throughout the series. After the Cronos conquest, Agito leads a resistance organization known as "Zeus No Ikazuchi" or "Zeus' Thunderbolts", as he plans to overthrow Cronos and steal their power (as the god Zeus did to his father, Cronos).

Shizu Onuma and her family have been serving the Makishima family for many years, tending to their properties and caring for Agito in his youth. Although she is by nature kind and gentle, she can be extremely dangerous when she is acting in his interests since her devotion to him is total and overriding any other consideration. She gave her body to the ambition of Agito and leads the processed "Liberatus" of the Zeus' Thunderbolts organization, having been transformed into the proto-zoalord Griselda. She capable of protecting the Liberatus from the psychic control of Cronos' overlords, although her lifespan has been greatly diminished by the transformation.

Fumio is a widower and Shō's father, but almost nothing else is known about him. He is captured and used by Cronos as a guinea pig and turned into a Guyver-killer Zoanoid to entrap Shō. He ends up being killed by Guyver I in battle.

He is a battle creature that hunts down other Zoanoids created by Cronos (except Lost Numbers). By absorbing small amounts of DNA from other Zoanoids, he can replicate their forms and powers, as well as mix the attributes of several Zoanoids in one body. He can regenerate himself even if only small pieces of him are left. Since discovering this ability, he begins killing Zoanoids to take their powers and bio-matter in order to become the most powerful battle creature and becomes a renegade from Cronos. In time, he comes to ally himself with the Guyvers in various battles. Aptom was one of the lost number commandos along with his two compatriots, Somlum and Dyme, who were killed in battle with Guyver I. This leads Aptom to carry a vendetta against Shō. Over time, Aptom questions his own motives and considers Cronos' part in his suffering. He was originally developed as a Zoanoid with the ability to morph into different types of Zoanoids and possess the power of the types he morphs into, but the project failed and he became a Lost Number. Dr. Barcus was interested in Aptom's abilities and carried out further experiments on him. This freed Aptom from the mental control of the Zoalords and gave him the ability to rapidly evolve. Aptom also has other unexpected abilities, including the ability to regenerate himself even from the smallest remaining piece of his tissue and the ability to clone himself, each clone having its own consciousness. Throughout the story, he has gone through several different chosen forms after absorbing multiple Zoanoids. His human shape is of a muscular man with a distinctive scar that runs down the left side of his face from hairline to jaw. He often dresses in a leather jacket, jeans and sunglasses.

One of Dr. Odagiri's assistants, and the one who manipulated security footage at the Relic's Point base to cover Agito Makishima sneeking Shō Fukamachi and Mizuki Segawa in. He is later the sole survivor of that group of scientists that escaped in the relic, along with the Segawa siblings and Agito Makishima's aids, after the destruction of the Relic's point base. The scientists were infected by a deadly virus as Cronos' means of keeping them under control. The only way to escape death is to be supplied with regular shots or to become Zoanoids. The only way to become a Zoanoid and yet not be slaves to the Zoalords is to become a Lost Number. Since supplies of the medicine were running out, they resorted to attempt to becoming Lost Numbers. Hayami was the only scientist that survived the process, becoming "Bio-Freezer". He possesses the unique power to affect the temperature of the environment around him to a certain extent. Aptom finds him and, once he realizes what Hayami is, brings him to meet the Guyvers and their friends. Unfortunately, later on his mission with Sho to save Aptom from the three rogue Zoalords, he sacrifices himself to save the latter, knowing that he was going to die anyway, due to flaws in the make-shift optimization process, passing his powers on-to Aptom.

Valkyria is a former member of Cronos and the step-sister of the late Oswald A. Lisker. Her mother was Astrid Forsberg and her stepfather was US Senator Robert P. Lisker. Their marriage was arranged by Cronos to unite the powerful American and Swedish Cronos families together. Robert was quite cold to Valkyria, but initially Oswald acted like a big brother to her. After her mother's death she came to resent the submissive role she had been dealt and proceeded to work her way up the ranks of Cronos to avoid being used as a pawn the way her mother was. Her goal to show up her brother was destroyed upon his death, shattering her. She stole the artificial control medallion (that was being developed by Cronos to create their own pseudo-Guyver units) and became "Guyver II Female". She resisted any of Cronos' attempts to stop her and has teamed with the former Zoalord Richard Guyot. She is plagued by bouts of fatigue and dizziness, even in human form, as a result of becoming a pseudo-Guyver.

A mysterious figure that has begun collecting Zoacrystals from the deceased Zoalords. He appears to wear a dark armor made from the same material as Guyver's control metal. He has demonstrated mind control, an ability only seen used by Uranus or Zoalord. He also mimicked Caerleon's self-division by manipulation of 'unfolded space'. Dr Barcus has speculated that Apollon could be a vanguard of the Uranus. He also appears to be on a tight schedule. He is likely based upon apollyon. Even though the katakana is closer to Apollon, the kanji that is often used beside it is abyss.

Cronos

Director of Cronos' Japan Branch, he is in charge when the Japan Branch loses the Guyver Units. While initially one of the people in charge of developing new Zoanoids, Genzo has, unknown to him, fallen behind in this category as well once Dr. Barcus begins designing Hyper Zoanoids, Zoanoids of highly enhanced capabilities. His failures to retrieve the Units as well as come up with any significantly new Zoanoid designs results in Commander Richart Guyot relieving him of duty. Genzo is then used as a guinea pig for the new "Enzyme" Zoanoid prototype, a Zoanoid specifically designed to destroy the Guyver Armor by dissolving it with its acid. After he retrieves Guyver I's Control Metal in battle, he is ordered by Guyot to self-destruct when the dissolving Guyver I attacks Enzyme.

A Cronos agent, or as he describes himself to Shō, "an inspector from Cronos HQ". Lisker was in Japan to supervise the transfer of the inactive Guyver Units to Cronos headquarters and was considerably annoyed to discover Makishima had managed to lose them. When one damaged unit was recovered, he insisted on taking a look at it and involuntarily became its host. As the second known activated Unit, he was called "Guyver II". A man vain of both looks and martial arts skills, he decided to take on the task of retrieving the Unit Shō had bonded with. His Control Metal, which had been damaged when the Unit was initially lost, malfunctioned under the stress of combat. Shō took advantage of his weakened state and struck the metal, causing further malfunction. The control metal burst out of his head and the organism that made up the armor began to consume Lisker's body. Shō then used his Mega-Smasher to put him out of his misery. Lisker is tall, with curly blond hair.

Zoalords

 
Quite easily the most powerful being on Earth, Archanfel appears to be a young, fair-haired man with pointy ears and cat-slitted eyes. He is the founder, creator and ruler of Cronos. He is an extremely powerful psychic and possesses amazing battle abilities. Archanfel was created by "the Creators" to be the leader of all the Zoanoids and the people on Earth. The Zoacrystals that give Zoalords their powers were all cultivated using Archanfel's crystal as a base.
Quoted from book 14, page 16:
"And then... cleaving and cultivating one of Archanfel's Zoacrystals, we created eleven others. Accepting one of them, I became a Zoalord. In the centuries since then, I have searched for the ten chosen people who would become Zoalords as well."
Although powerful, he has been increasingly dormant since prehistoric days. When the Creators withdrew from Earth, they attempted to destroy it with a gigantic meteorite which was stopped by Archanfel at great cost to himself. To save himself, he is looking to gain possession of one of the Guyver Units, in-order to stabilize his condition.
 
Co-founder of Cronos and the second eldest member of the Council of Twelve. He is responsible for designing and creating the first Hyper Zoanoids and completing the final work on most of the Zoalords. He is over 400 years old and is, in fact, the person who awoke Archanfel from his long slumber. He is widely believed to be the top scientist of Cronos and is said to have greater telepathic prowess than any other Zoalord, save for Archanfel. His seniority among the others has resulted in many of the Zoalords to look up at him with much respect and as such he is occasionally referred to as "Old Bal" by those closest to him.
 
Discovered by Barcus 370 years ago in Armenia. He is a close friend of Freidrich von Purgstall and commands Cloud Gate after his death. He is considered to be the third-in-command of Cronos after Barcus. His brief appearance as a Zoalord showcased his incredible capabilities by being able to target various missiles in long range and in all directions, then destroy them with precision.
 
Discovered by Barcus 215 years ago in Vienna. He generally seems to be more compassionate toward the civilian population than the other Zoalords. He is one of the weakest in close-range battle, but his lightning-based power can be formidable. Laser weapons are ineffective against him, as he can absorb and redirect the attacks. Unintended for hand-to-hand fighting, his physical defense is minimal. He was murdered by the rogue trio of Zoalords after being severely weakened from his battle with Guyver I.
 
One of three rogue Zoalords out to overthrow Cronos and obtain a Guyver unit.
 
A rogue Zoalord. A diminutive old man who mostly levitates with his legs crossed, Cabral's immediate ability seems to be the power to petrify a Zoanoid. It is unknown if this extends to other lifeforms. This ability seems to also entail the control of other bodies, up to thousands of them, which can then be merged to create a giant battle form. As Cabral exercises his abilities, he goes through various 'modes': brain mode, draglord mode, and extirpate mode. The brain mode serves as the nerve center for the later stages, the final of which features a huge set of wings and an enormous ranged beam weapon capable of destruction on a city-wide scale. Cablarl used his abilities to capture Aptom, luring Sho out to rescue him. Cabral controlled Aptom for a time with the use of an artificial brain implanted inside him; after Aptom was freed, he killed Cabral as revenge.
 
A gentle-looking man with long curly hair. Édouard was not heavily featured in the manga (and thus had little dialogue) until Chapter 164, where he was shown to be stationed on The Ark (Cronos' habitable spaceship) guarding the three Zoacrystals that formerly belonged to Purg'stall, Waferdanos and Li Yan Tsui. Édouard is subsequently confronted by the mysterious Apollyon, who was first seen secretly retrieving the Zoacrystal of Cablarl Khān upon his death. Édouard transforms into his Zoalord battle form and engages in conflict with Apollyon, who is seeking the three Zoacrystals on the Ark. His main special Zoaform ability seems to be self division by manipulation of 'unfolded space'. Édouard is badly injured when Apollon mimics his ability and rips his Zoacrystal out of his forehead, taking it along with the other three crystals Édouard was protecting. This has left him badly withered.
 
Another rogue. Wears a turban and has a visible Zoacrystal. Although not officially confirmed, he is believed to be named after the famous Arabic alchemist, Jabir Ibn Hayyan.
 
The second Zoalord to be found by Barcus, he is the only Zoalord confirmed not to have a human origin. He is a collective formed by a living forest. The name "Waferdanos" is the name of the island or Kingdom that the creature lives on. Barcus believes him to be older than both Archanfel and the human race as well. He was a previous bio-weapon prototype abandoned by the Creators. Deceased as a result of the destruction of the Arizona headquarter with Yan Tsui.
 
Looks like a large man made of rock. He has so far only demonstrated an attack using his mouth's flaming breath to help destroy The Creators Relic. Hardly ever speaks and little is known about him. Of all the Zoalords he is the tallest as well as huskiest in appearance.
 
A mysterious young Chinese man with jet black hair, whose Zoalord form is a green battle creature with huge prisms on his forearms. Li Yantui uses the prisms to attack with a technique named "Zue Kong Zhan" (絕空斬) that seems to involve dimensional wormholes. He marks a set of coordinates and links two points in space with a 'window'. He uses these to instantly travel from point-to-point or slice through other objects. Deceased as a result of the destruction of the Arizona headquarters along with Waferdanos as they battled Guyver III and his allies. He, along with Waferdanos, managed to protect Barcus up until their deaths and it was Li Yan Tsui who managed to allow Barcus to escape the battle. His name was romanized as Rienzi in the 1996 book "Guyver: Visual Data File".
 
A tall, powerfully-built man, Guyot would stand out in a crowd without his large blonde hair and abnormal eyes. He is an immensely commanding presence. Guyot has been bio-engineered into a Zoalord and was given the ability to control gravity, making him more powerful than the others, second only to Archanfel. His ultimate weapon is the "Artificial Black-Hole", which, like its name implies, creates something like a black-hole and will suck everything that surrounds it. Guyot discovered the secret of the Guyver before the other ten Zoalords (Archanfel knew this all along) and foolishly pursued it in order to merge with it and take control of Cronos. This ambition was known to Murakami, who had made it his goal to destroy Guyot. Guyot's ambition caused him to hide the device called the "Unit Remover", which he was about to use on Guyver III when Archanfel showed up and stripped him of his Zoacrystal. He has recently been shown to be alive and working with the rogue Zoalords. He was reprocessed into a proto-zoalord, fulfilling the reversal between him and Murakami. It appears that he has successfully recruited Guyver II-F to their cause. It is likely that his name is derived from the geological formations known as guyots, as there are instances of these having strange gravity anomalies surrounding them. In the Viz translations, his name is translated as "Reichmann Gyro".
 
Masaki was a freelance journalist captured by Cronos and used as an experimental guinea pig in the Zoalord development program. He is a 'prototype body' for the Zoalord form of Richart Guyot. He joins with Shō to fight Cronos. When combating the Zoanoids in his human form, he uses a massive revolver called a Zoanoid Buster. After Guyot mortally wounds him, Archanfel retrieves Masaki's body. Murakami is turned into an obedient, powerful Cronos general—and a full Zoalord, who assumes the name "Imakarum Mirabilis" to take the place of the fallen Guyot. When his obedience is questioned, Barcus explains that Imakarum Mirabilis has a unique relationship with Archanfel. They are in constant telepathic link, as if he is a part of Archanfel, which explains the nature of his sudden loyalty towards Archanfel. He is now more powerful than Guyot was and has been given Guyot's Zoacrystal. Masaki is a tall, thin young man with shoulder-length hair. He normally wears sunglasses even at night. After Archanfel gets his claws into him, the glasses conceal the fact he now has cat-pupiled eyes.

Manga volumes
 The Unit called "G"
 Cronos
 Murakami's Secret
 Aptom's Menace
 The 12 Lords
 Guyot's Counterattack
 The Menace of the Remover
 A New Beginning
 Guyver Gigantic
 The 13th Lord
 The Living Ark
 Archanfel's Island
 Gigantic Dark
 Final Match
 The Return of the Guyver
 Purg'stall's Attack
 His Name is Libertus
 Imakarum's Awakening
 To the Abyss
 Evil Aptom
 Revenge
 The Dark Kingdom's Rebirth
 The Real Face of Divinity
 Aptom's Return
 The Draglord's Attack
 Reid of the Valkyria
 Beginning of Calamity
 Gigantomakhia
 The Unexpected Guests
 On the Isle of Mysterious
 Yoke of Fate
 Colossi of the Darkness

Anime

 The Guyver: Bio-Booster Armor, a 1989 12-episode OVA series
 Guyver: The Bioboosted Armor, a 2005 26-episode anime series

Guyver: Out of Control
Guyver: Out of Control is a 1986 short horror original video animation based on the manga. It was produced in Japan by Bandai, Studio Live, Network, Animate and Movic and in association with AIC, Artland, Studio Victory, Wave and Only For A Lite. It was released in the U.S. and Canada in 1993 by L.A. Hero under the Dark Image Entertainment label. It has since been out of print in North America. The story follows high school students Shō Fukamachi and Mizuki Segawa who accidentally discover one of three Bio Booster Armor units stolen from the Chronos Corporation. When Shō and Mizuki are attacked by a Zoanoid, the unit comes into contact with Shō and bonds with him, transforming him into Guyver I and promptly destroying the Zoanoid assailant. Meanwhile, a female Chronos agent named Valcuria acquires a second unit and becomes Guyver II. She then abducts Mizuki in order to challenge Shō for the Guyver I unit. On Anime News Network, Justin Sevakis called it an "extremely dated piece of pulp that still somehow manages to be fun".

References

External links
 

 
1985 manga
1986 anime OVAs
1986 horror films
Biopunk anime and manga
Direct-to-video animated films
Genetic engineering in fiction
Horror anime and manga
Japanese animated horror films
Japanese animated science fiction films
Kadokawa Shoten manga
Manga adapted into films
Seinen manga
Shōnen manga
Tokuma Shoten manga
Viz Media manga